Joy Nash (born August 5, 1980) is an American actress best known for her role as Alicia "Plum" Kettle on the AMC television series Dietland. Before this breakout role, she appeared in Twin Peaks: The Return and The Mindy Project among other television shows. She wrote and directed A Fat Rant, a viral video in 2007.

Filmography

Films

Television

References

External links 
 

1980 births
Living people
Actresses from Dallas
21st-century American actresses
University of Southern California alumni